Ceded Districts is the name of an area in the Deccan, India that was 'ceded' to the British East India Company by the Nizam in 1800. The name was in use during the whole period of the British Raj, even though the denomination had no official weight for legal or administrative purposes. The area largely corresponds to the modern region of Rayalaseema.

History
Following the Treaty of Seringapatam the Tippu Sultan accepted to give his northern territory to the Nizam of Hyderabad in 1792 AD.

In 1796 AD, the then Nizam Asaf Jah II, harassed by the Marathas and Tipu Sultan, opted to get British military protection under Lord Wellesley's doctrine of Subsidiary Alliance. Now, as a part of this agreement, the Nizam ceded a large portion of the acquired territory to the British, to be added to the Madras Presidency. This area was also known as the Ceded Districts, a term still used for the areas, and included the present day districts of Anantapuram, Kadapa (Cuddapah), much of Karnoolu (Kurnool), Bellary, and parts of Tumkur (Pavagada taluk).

After the defeat and death of Tipu Sultan in the Fourth Anglo-Mysore War at Battle of Srirangapattana, the Mysooru (Mysore) territories (Map) were divided up between the Wodeyars, the Nizam and the British East India Company.

References

Districts of British India
Territorial evolution